FinalBuilder  is a commercial Windows build automation tool that provides a unified graphical interface to author and execute build projects. Once defined, a project can only be run either via the graphical interface or command line program to execute build projects. A project consists of actions, of which there are around 650 types defined as of version 6. Projects are stored in a zipped XML format.

Developed by VSoft Technologies, FinalBuilder is in competition with NAnt and MSBuild. It is written in Delphi, C# (FinalBuilder hosts the Microsoft .NET CLR), VBScript, and JScript. The tool has a mild bias towards building Delphi projects, but it supports a range of compilers making it suitable for building projects in many languages.

History
The first version of FinalBuilder was made publicly available in May, 2000. It quickly gained popularity and found a strong user base, particularly among the Delphi community. This was due to it being only one of only two graphical build tools available at the time - the other being Visual Build.

Due to the early adoption by Delphi developers, VSoft initially focused on developing support for Delphi tools. However, in more recent versions, VSoft have expanded FinalBuilder's support for other development environments and frameworks, most notably Visual Studio and the .NET Framework.

In 2008, VSoft released version 6 of FinalBuilder, which included a server application for remotely managing build servers and implementing Continuous Integration.

Built-in actions
As of version 6, FinalBuilder includes more than 650 different action types. It is beyond the scope of this article to list every action, but the notable actions categories include:
 Version Control System actions for automating interaction with 17 different version control systems
 Compiler actions for executing a 19 different source code compilers
 Setup/installer programs and help file compiler actions
 Communication actions for sending build notifications with email, news servers, ICQ and MSN
 Automated Testing tool actions to automate tests as part of a build process
 File and Folder actions for file transfers with FTP and SFTP and local file system management

ActionStudio
ActionStudio is a stand-alone IDE for developing custom actions or plugins for FinalBuilder. Using JScript, VBScript, PowerShell, IronPython or any other .NET languages, users of ActionStudio can create custom FinalBuilder actions to include in their build projects. Action files define the properties, events, options and property pages in an XML file format.

FinalBuilder Server
Since the release of version 6, FinalBuilder has included a continuous integration server, called FinalBuilder Server.

FinalBuilder Server provides a number of triggers for automating the regular integration of code. Triggers include:
 Time Trigger: for scheduling builds
 File Trigger: for starting builds when file/s or folder/s change
 Run Process Trigger: for executing a process and then conditionally running a build based on the outcome of that process
 Version Control Triggers: for running a build with every check-in to a version control system

FinalBuilder Server supports continuous integration with the following version control systems:
 AlienBrain
 AccuRev
 ClearCase (Base and UCM)
 Concurrent Versions System (CVS)
 Perforce Helix
 StarTeam
 Subversion (svn)
 Surround SCM
 Vault
 Visual SourceSafe (VSS)
 Team Foundation Version Control (TFVC)
 Plastic SCM

See also
Software build automation
Continuous Integration

References

External links

Build automation
Pascal (programming language) software